The Reformer and the Redhead is a 1950 American romantic comedy film written, produced and directed by Norman Panama and Melvin Frank, and starring June Allyson and Dick Powell.

Overview
Kathleen Maguire (Allyson) is the daughter of a long-time zookeeper, Dr. Kevin G. Maguire (Cecil Kellaway), who is fired from his job for political reasons.  She turns for help to a crusading young attorney, Andrew Rockton Hale (Powell).  Trouble comes in the form of both political corruption and a loose lion.

Cast 
 June Allyson as Kathleen Maguire
 Dick Powell as Andrew Rockton Hale
 David Wayne as Arthur Colner Maxwell
 Cecil Kellaway as Dr. Kevin G. Maguire
 Ray Collins as Commodore John Balwind Parker
 Robert Keith as Tim Harveigh
 Marvin Kaplan as Leon
 Kathleen Freeman as Lily Rayton Parker
 Wally Maher as Jerry Nolard Boyle
 Alex Gerry as James I. Michell
 Charles Evens as Mr. Eberle 
 Paul Maxey as Thompson
Uncredited:
 Matt Moore as butler
 John Hamilton as police captain
 Frank Sully as officer
 Mario Siletti as Italian storekeeper
 Theodore Von Eltz as announcer
 Jerry Paris as page boy
 Mae Clarke as clerk
 Spring Byington as voice of Kathleen's mother
 Tor Johnson as big Finnish man
 Edward Peil, Sr. as gateman

Reception
According to MGM records the film earned $1,688,000 in the US and Canada and $439,000 elsewhere, resulting in a profit of $214,000.

References

External links

 
 
 
 
 

1950 films
1950 romantic comedy films
American romantic comedy films
American black-and-white films
Films directed by Melvin Frank
Films scored by David Raksin
Metro-Goldwyn-Mayer films
1950 directorial debut films
1950s English-language films
1950s American films